George Soule or Soulé may refer to:

 George Soule (Mayflower passenger) (c. 1602–1677/80), colonist
 George Soulé (industrialist) (1849–1922), founder of the Soulé Steam Feed Works
 George Soulé (musician) (born 1945), American songwriter, musician and record producer
 George Henry Soule Jr. (1887–1970), labor economist and editor for the New Republic
 George Soule (educator) (1834–1926), Louisiana author, educator, and soldier